The mahogany tree frog (Tlalocohyla loquax) is a species of frog in the family Hylidae found in Belize, Costa Rica, Guatemala, Honduras, Mexico, and Nicaragua.

Its natural habitats are subtropical or tropical moist lowland forests, subtropical or tropical moist montane forests, freshwater marshes, intermittent freshwater marshes, pastureland, rural gardens, and heavily degraded former forests. It is threatened by habitat loss.

References

Tlalocohyla
Frogs of North America
Amphibians of Central America
Amphibians of Mexico
Amphibians described in 1934
Taxa named by Helen Beulah Thompson Gaige
Taxa named by Laurence Cooper Stuart
Taxonomy articles created by Polbot